The Ness Monsters were an American football team from the north of  Scotland who were based in Inverness. The team was named after the Loch Ness Monster and the Monsters played in Grey and Green.

The team was founded in October 1986 and played in their first game against the Clydesdale Colts in early 1987 where the team lost 66-0. Later that years they joined the BAFA Thistle League where they played their first regular season game on 19 April against the Capital Clansmen at Telford Street Park, Inverness. The club played competitive American football up until 1989.

1987 Season

 Ness Monsters Results 

Ness Monster 44-0 Capital Clansmen (H) 
19 April 1987

Strathmore Scorpions 30-12 Ness Monsters (A)
3 May 1987

Ness Monsters 36-6 Barrhead Redhawks (H)
17 May 1987

Dundee Whalers 44-6 Ness Monsters (A) 
24 May 1987

Fife 49ers 68-30 Ness Monsters (A)
31 May 1987

Ness Monsters 22-32 Strathmore Scorpions (H) 
14 June 1987

Capital Clansmen 30-32 Ness Monsters (A)
21 June 1987

Ness Monsters 24-52 Dundee Whalers (H) 
12 July 1987

Barrhead Redhawks 6-32 Ness Monsters (A) 
2 August 1987

Ness Monsters 44-0 Fife 49ers (H)
9 August 1987

Thistle League Table

1988 Season

Ness Monsters Results

Ness Monsters 8-29 Strathclyde Sheriffs

Ness Monsters 12-13 Glasgow Diamonds

Ness Monsters 112-6 Inverclyde Comets

Ness Monsters 14-0 Strathmore Scorpions

Ness Monsters 14-28 Forth Valley Generals

Ness Monsters 24-6 Capital Clansmen

Ness Monsters 28-6 Glasgow Diamonds

Ness Monsters 6-22 Strathclyde Sheriffs

Ness Monsters 18-0 Capital Clansmen

Ness Monsters 24-6 Strathmore Scorpions

Caledonian Bowl
Ness Monsters 12-46 Strathclyde Sheriffs

Caledonian American Football League Table

1989 Season 

Ness Monsters Results

Ness Monsters 6-6 Forth Valley Generals

Ness Monsters 1-0 Livingston Chieftains

Ness Monsters 16-14 Livingston Chieftains

Ness Monsters 8-22 Forth Valley Generals

2000 Return 

After an 11-year wait the Ness Monsters played their last ever games of American Football against the Fort William Phoenix before bowing out of the sport altogether.

The results of these games are as follows:

Fort William Phoenix 50-0 Ness Monsters

December 2000

Ness Monsters 0-36 Fort William Phoenix

28 January 2001

References 

American football teams in Scotland
Sport in Inverness
Defunct American football teams in Europe
American football teams established in 1986
Sports clubs disestablished in 1989
1986 establishments in Scotland
1989 disestablishments in Scotland